A list of French produced or co-produced films released in France in 2009:

References

External links
 2009 in France
 2009 in French television
 French films of 2009 at the Internet Movie Database
French films of 2009 at Cinema-francais.fr

2009
Films
French